Alive in Standby was an experimental pop punk/post-hardcore band from Shelby Township, Michigan, formed in 2010. Their debut album, Never Ending, was released on July 29, 2014.

Based in the college town of Shelby Township, Michigan, singer Chris Koo, guitarists Ben Wilkins, bassist Koda Hult, and drummer Jacob Burkey. They released their first single "Weigh You Down". They disbanded in March 2016 with Koo and a few other band members forming a new group called The True Blue.

Members 

Current
 Chris Koo – lead vocals, keyboards, programming, strings (2010–2016)
 Ben Wilkins - rhythm guitar (2010–2016)
 Jacob Burkey – drums (2013–2016)
 Koda Hult – bass, backing vocals (2013–2016)

Former
 Anthony Persichetti – drums, backing vocals (2010–13)
 Steve Ervinck - lead guitar (2010–12)
 Anthony Lucido – bass (2010–13)

Discography

Studio albums 
Never Ending (2014)

Extended plays

Music videos

References

External links 

American pop punk groups
Musical groups from Michigan
Musical groups established in 2010
Musical quintets
2010 establishments in Michigan